Daniel Atzori (birth name Daniele Atzori) was born in Milan on May 17, 1981. He is an author, research and commentator as well as political and social analyst.

Biography 
Daniel Atzori  is the author of "Islamisation and Globalisation in Jordan", published by Routledge in 2015. He has been editorial team coordinator of the magazine "Papers of Dialogue", published by the AGI news agency and senior researcher at Fondazione Eni Enrico Mattei (FEEM). He holds a PhD from the School of Government and International Affairs at Durham University, a bachelor's degree cum laude in History and a master's degree cum laude in Economic History from the Università degli Studi of Milan.

Writings 
His first book, "Fede e mercato: verso una via islamica al capitalismo?" (which translates as "Faith and market: towards an Islamic way to capitalism?"), was published in 2010. The book explores the interactions between Islam and global economy, examining in particular the moral economy of Islam, the birth of Islamic banks and the development of an Islamist middle class.

Daniele Atzori has also published an essay entitled "I Fratelli musulmani in Giordania" (The Muslim Brotherhood in Jordan) in a book edited by Massimo Campanini and Karim Mezran in which he analysed Islamic movements according to Gramsci's theory of hegemony.

Atzori's second book, "Islamisation and Globalisation in Jordan", studies the Muslim Brotherhood of Jordan, analysing their strategies and their network of Islamic institutions.

Bibliography

Books and book chapters 
"Islamisation and Globalisation in Jordan, Routledge, 2015 

“Fede e mercato: verso una via islamica al capitalismo?” (Faith and Market: Towards an Islamic Way to Capitalism?), Il Mulino, 2010 

“I Fratelli musulmani in Giordania”, in “I Fratelli musulmani nel mondo contemporaneo” (The Muslim Brothers in the contemporary world), edited by Massimo Campanini and Karim Mezran, UTET, 2010

Articles 
“La finanza islamica e la middle class islamista” (Islamic Finance and the Islamist Middle Class), in Equilibri, n. 3, 2007

“Islamizzare la società: i Fratelli Musulmani e la classe media in Giordania” (Islamising Society: the Muslim Brothers and the Middle Class in Jordan), in Afriche e Orienti, n. 1, 2008

“L’Islam e lo sviluppo sostenibile”, (Islam and Sustainable Development), in Equilibri, n. 3, 2008

“Seven years on: the Arab world and September 11th”, Oil Tabloid, n. 3, 2008

“Il segreto di Amman” (The secret of Amman), Dialoghi Internazionali, n. 7, 2008

“For the Arabs, the crisis is a problem for Europe and the USA”, Oil Tabloid, December 2008

“Che cosa vogliono i Fratelli Musulmani?” (What do the Muslim Brothers want?), in Equilibri (Fondazione Mattei – Il Mulino), n.1, 2009

“Lo spirito di Shangai” (The Spirit of Shanghai), in Equilibri (Fondazione Mattei – Il Mulino), n.1, 2009

“Il modello cinese in Medio Oriente” (The Chinese model in the Middle East), in Equilibri, n. 2, 2009

“Islamismo e Mercato in Turchia ed Egitto” (Islamism and Market in Turkey and Egypt), Equilibri, n. 3, 2009

“A Thawing of Relations with Iran?”, Oil Tabloid, June 2009

“Oil Prices and Rentier Mentality”, Oil Tabloid, n. 7, 2009

“Se lo spirito del capitalismo incontra il Corano” (If the Spirit of Capitalism Meets the Kuran), Formiche, n. 39, July 2009

“Gharb, Occidente” (Gharb, West), Impresa & Stato, n. 87, Winter 2009-2010

“Islam: tra spada e business. Le banche, gli interessi, la politica e i Fratelli Musulmani” (Islam: between sword and business. Banks, interests, politics and the Muslim Brotherhood), Formiche, n. 44, January 2010

“Moral values and financial markets: Islamic finance against the financial crisis?”, Fondazione Eni Enrico Mattei, January 2010

External links 
 Homepage of Daniel Atzori
 Daniele Atzori's Profile on the Fondazione Eni Enrico Mattei's website

References 

Living people
Italian male writers
1981 births
Writers from Milan
University of Milan alumni
Alumni of Durham University